Boʻka is a city in Tashkent Region, Uzbekistan. It is the administrative center of Boʻka District. Its population is 22,200 (2016).

References

Populated places in Tashkent Region
Cities in Uzbekistan